The Angel Araneta Ledesma Ancestral House is one of the heritage houses  in Silay City, Negros Occidental, Philippines belonging to Angel Araneta Ledesma and his wife Rizalina Javelona Lopez. Also known as Balay Verde or the Green House, it is strategically located along Plaridel Street, near the Silay City Hall, the San Diego Pro-cathedral, Police Department, and the Puericulture Center.

History and architecture
The Angel Araneta Ledesma Ancestral House was built in 1933 using the logs that were available in the lumber yard business of Angel Ledesma. The two-story house combines the Colonial Plantation architecture and the American clapboard style that was popular in the Revivalist era of the American period.

In 1992, the family sold the house to an individual, who later sold it to the government of Silay. Eventually, it houses the Office of Culture, Arts and Tourism of the City of Silay.

References

External links

Heritage Houses in the Philippines
Buildings and structures in Silay
Tourist attractions in Negros Occidental